Ikenne is a Local Government Area in Ogun State, Nigeria.

It has an area of 144 km and a population of 118,735 at the 2006 census.

The postal code of the area is 121.

Wards in Ikenne 

 Ikenne i
 Ikenne ii
 Ilisan i
 Ilisan ii
 Irolu
 Iperu i
 Iperu ii
 Iperu iii
 Ogere i
 Ogere ii

Notable people in Ikenne 

 Obafemi Awolowo
 Yemi Osibajo
 Kunle Soname
 Remsport

References

 Chief Obafemi Awolowo
 Dr. Tai Solarin
 Chief Mrs HID Awolowo

Local Government Areas in Ogun State